Mezium is a genus of beetles in the subfamily Ptininae, the spider beetles. It is distributed throughout most of the world. There are two centers of distribution: an area extending from the Iberian Peninsula to Morocco, including the Canary Islands; and an area extending through central and southern Africa. Several species are recently described African endemics. They are most common in coastal areas, and in regions with a Mediterranean climate.

Their most common natural habitat type is caves, where they feed on animal feces, especially bat guano. They are adaptable to human-made structures such as barns and chicken coops.

Species include:
Mezium affine – shiny spider beetle
Mezium africanum
Mezium americanum – American spider beetle, black spider beetle
Mezium andreaei
Mezium giganteum
Mezium glabrum
Mezium gracilicorne
Mezium horridum
Mezium namibiensis
Mezium pseudafricanum
Mezium pseudamericanum
Mezium setosum
Mezium sulcatum

References

Ptinidae
Polyphaga genera